Reg King (5 February 1945, Paddington, West London – 8 October 2010, Belvedere, Kent) was an English singer and songwriter, most famous for being the solo and lead singer with The Boys and The Action. He died of cancer, aged 65, in October 2010.

Solo discography

Albums
Reg King (1971)
The eponymous solo LP was released by United Artists records, and features members of "B.B. Blunder" (ex-Blossom Toes) and "Mighty Baby" (ex-The Action), plus Mick Taylor, Steve Winwood, Brian Auger and Danny McCulloch.

The album was reissued in 2006 by Circle Records,  The CD has 6 bonus tracks.

Looking For a Dream (2013)
This collection is a second, previously unreleased album, issued again by Circle Records, under his nickname Reggie King.

Singles
"Little Boy" b/w "10,000 Miles" (United Artists UP 35204) 1971

EPs
Missing In Action 10"/6-Track EP (Circle Records CPW E10-101, 2007)
Side 1
"Merry Go Round" (King) 3.29 +
"You Go Have Yourself A Good Time" (King/Dale) 3.55 *
"Magenta" (King) 5.54 +
Side 2
"So Full of Love" (King) 4.21 +
"10,000 Miles" (King/Dale) 3.21 *
"Must Be Something Else Around" (King) 4.32 *

Compilation albums
The track "Gone Away" appears on United Artists Records 1971 sampler All Good Clean Fun (UDX 201/2)
The single "Little Boy" appears on the 2004 EMI CD re-package of All Good Clean Fun (Liberty 8660902)

References

External links

1945 births
2010 deaths
People from Paddington
English male singers
English songwriters
English soul singers
English pop singers
Deaths from cancer in England
British rhythm and blues boom musicians
British male songwriters